The Archimede class were a group of four submarines built for the  (Royal Italian Navy) in the early 1930s. The boats fought in the Spanish Civil War (under the Nationalist flag) and in World War II. In Spanish service, two boats were known as the General Mola class; these were taken out of service in 1959.

Design
The ships were designed by the firm Cavallini and were a partially double hulled design. Like most of the later ocean-going submarines of the Italian navy, their deck armament consisting of two  guns was conceived to deal with armed merchantmen in surface combat. They also mounted two  anti-aircraft machine guns. The number of torpedoes was increased from 12 on the Settembrini class to 16.

Boats
All boats were built by the shipyard of Franco Tosi at Taranto, between 1930 and 1934.

Torricelli and Archimede took part in the Spanish Civil war under the Italian flag since 1936, carrying out undercover operations. Eventually both submarines were secretly delivered to the Spanish nationalists in April 1937.

See also
 Italian submarines of World War II
List of foreign ships wrecked or lost in the Spanish Civil War

Notes

References

Further reading

External links
 Archimede Marina Militare website

 
Military units and formations of the Spanish Civil War
Ships built in Italy
Ships built by Cantieri navali Tosi di Taranto
Submarine classes
 Archimede
Submarines of the Spanish Navy